Council Directive 80/1269/EEC of 16 December 1980 on the approximation of the laws of the Member States relating to the engine power of motor vehicles is a European Union law concerning measurement of engine power in motor vehicles intended for road use with at least four wheels and a maximum speed exceeding 25 km/h. Council Directive 80/1269/EEC is based upon ISO 1585 with some influence of ECE regulation 85. It can essentially be seen as an updated version of DIN 70020, which it has replaced.

External links
 http://eur-lex.europa.eu/LexUriServ/LexUriServ.do?uri=CELEX:31980L1269:EN:NOT

80 1269
Vehicle law
1980 in law
1980 in the European Economic Community